Yep Roc Records is an American independent record label based in Hillsborough, North Carolina, and owned by Redeye Distribution. Since 1997, the label has released albums from North Carolina and international artists, including Nick Lowe, Paul Weller, Mandolin Orange, Steep Canyon Rangers, Jim Lauderdale, Dave Alvin, Tift Merritt, Chuck Prophet, Robyn Hitchcock, Alejandro Escovedo, Aoife O'Donovan, Chatham County Line, Los Straitjackets, Amy Helm, Gang of Four, The Apples in Stereo, and Ian McLagan.

History
Tor Hansen started the label in 1997, two years after moving to North Carolina to help manage a chain of record stores in the South. He recruited his friend and former bandmate Glenn Dicker, with whom he had worked at Rounder Records. They made the decision to also start a distribution wing, Redeye.

The first releases were local compilations, followed in subsequent years by records by Hüsker Dü's Bob Mould, Marah, Dolorean, The Legendary Shack Shakers, Cities, Dave Alvin, and Los Straitjackets.

The success of Los Straitjackets and the experience of working with Dicker on the Rounder-distributed Upstart convinced Nick Lowe to join Yep Roc. Scott McCaughey (The Minus 5, Young Fresh Fellows, The Baseball Project, The No Ones) joined the label because of Nick Lowe's presence, and has remained for almost a decade.

In 2016, Dicker was elected to the American Association of Independent Music Board of Directors.

Philosophy
Yep Roc calls itself "the artist-driven label that refuses to be labeled."  Glenn Dicker said, "It’s a little challenging when we do a singer-songwriter, some blues guy, some garage-rock guy, some indie thing. It’s a little bit all over the place. It presents fun challenges, but the marketing of this brand is difficult."

Artists

Alejandro Escovedo
American Princes
Amy Farris
Amy Helm
Aoife O'Donovan
BeauSoleil
Bell X1
Big Ass Truck
Big Sandy & His Fly-Rite Boys
Billy Bragg
Blitzen Trapper
Bob Mould
Born Ruffians (US)
Caitlin Cary
Chatham County Line
Cheyenne Mize 
Chris Stamey
Chuck Prophet
 Cities
DADDY LONG LEGS
Darren Hanlon
Dave Alvin
Dolorean
Doyle Bramhall
Dressy Bessy
Drink Up Buttercup
Elf Power
Eleni Mandell
Eli "Paperboy" Reed
Fountains of Wayne
Fujiya & Miyagi 
Gang of Four
Golden Suits
Grant-Lee Phillips
Greg Brown 
Heavy Trash
Heloise and the Savoir Faire
Ian Hunter
Ian McLagan
Ian Moore
Jack Klatt
Jeremy & the Harlequins
Jim Lauderdale
Jim White 
John Doe
Jonah Tolchin 
Josh Ritter
Josh Rouse
Jukebox the Ghost
Ken Stringfellow
Kim Richey 
Kissaway Trail
Kristin Hersh
Laika & the Cosmonauts
Liam Finn (US)
Look Park
Los Straitjackets
Madness (US distribution)
Mandolin Orange 
Marah
Mercury Rev
Michaela Anne
Nick Lowe (US)
Paul Weller (US)
Peggy Sue
Peter Case
Radio Birdman
Reckless Kelly
Robbie Fulks
Robert Skoro
Robyn Hitchcock
Rock Plaza Central
Rodney Crowell
Ron Sexsmith
Shadowy Men on a Shadowy Planet
Simple Kid
Sloan
Southern Culture on the Skids
Spencer Dickinson
Steep Canyon Rangers
Steve Wynn and the Miracle 3 
Thad Cockrell
Th' Legendary Shack Shakers
The Apples in Stereo
The Autumn Defense
The Baseball Project
The Bigger Lovers 
The Butchies
The Cake Sale
The Comas
The Felice Brothers
The Fleshtones
The Flesh Eaters
The Go-Betweens
The Gourds
The Iguanas
The Kingsbury Manx
The Mayflies USA
The Minus 5
The Moaners
The No Ones
The Old Ceremony
The Relatives
The Reverend Horton Heat
The Rubinoos
The Sadies
The Soft Boys 
The Soundtrack of Our Lives 
The Standard
The Stray Birds
The Third Mind
Tift Merritt 
Trailer Bride
Tres Chicas
Tony Joe White 
Wesley Stace
You Am I
Young Fresh Fellows

Owners
Tor Hansen and Glen Dicker currently own Yep Roc Records.  Glenn Dicker is on The Music Business Association board of directors. Tor Hansen is a board member of the association. In August 2013, Hansen spoke as a representative of the association before the US Congress Judiciary Committee on Copyrights.

See also
 List of record labels

References

External links
Official site

American independent record labels
Indie rock record labels
Companies based in Chapel Hill-Carrboro, North Carolina
American companies established in 1997
Record labels established in 1997
1997 establishments in North Carolina